Tommaso Caracciolo, O.S.B. (30 June 1640 – 31 March 1689) was a Roman Catholic prelate who served as Bishop of Gerace (1687–1689).

Biography
Tommaso Caracciolo was born in Naples, Italy on 30 June 1640 and ordained a priest in the Order of Saint Benedict on 22 September 1663.
On 28 April 1687, he was appointed during the papacy of Pope Innocent XI as Bishop of Gerace. On 4 May 1687, he was consecrated bishop by Marcantonio Barbarigo, Archbishop of Corfù, with Pier Antonio Capobianco, Bishop Emeritus of Lacedonia, and Stefano Giuseppe Menatti, Titular Bishop of Cyrene, serving as co-consecrators. He served as Bishop of Gerace until his death on 4 May 1687.

See also
Catholic Church in Italy

References

External links and additional sources
(for Chronology of Bishops) 
 (for Chronology of Bishops) 

17th-century Italian Roman Catholic bishops
Bishops appointed by Pope Innocent XI
1640 births
1689 deaths
Benedictine bishops